Mompha confusella is a moth in the family Momphidae. It found from central and southern Europe to Transcaucasia. In Europe, it has been recorded from the Czech Republic, Austria, Hungary, Slovakia, Ukraine and Russia.

Adults are on wing from mid July to the end of May of the following year after overwintering. There is one generation per year.

The larvae feed on Epilobium hirsutum and Chamaenerion angustifolium. The larvae probably feed inside the stem and cause a gall to be formed.

References

External links

Lepiforum e. V.

Moths described in 1996
Moths of Europe
Momphidae